Wintersburg is an unincorporated community and census-designated place in Maricopa County, Arizona, United States, located  west of downtown Phoenix and  west of Buckeye along Salome Highway. As of the 2020 census, Wintersburg had a population of 51, down from 136 in 2010.

Wintersburg is home to the Palo Verde Nuclear Generating Station, the largest nuclear power plant in the United States.

Demographics 

As of the census of 2010, there were 136 people living in the CDP. The population density was 274.5 people per square mile. The racial makeup of the CDP was 82% White, 2% Black or African American, 1% Native American, 2% Pacific Islander, and 12% from other races. 26% of the population were Hispanic or Latino of any race.

Images of Wintersburg
These are some images of Wintersburg

References

Census-designated places in Maricopa County, Arizona